Hornietus is a genus of aphodiine dung beetles in the family Scarabaeidae. There is one described species in Hornietus, H. ventralis.

References

Further reading

 
 
 
 

Scarabaeidae
Articles created by Qbugbot